Vasudevan (15 June 1944 – 20 February 2011), known as Malaysia Vasudevan, was a Malaysian-Indian playback singer and actor in Tamil cinema.

Early life
Malaysia Vasudevan's parents were from Palakkad. Chattu Nair of Ottappalam and Ammalu of Polpulli, along with their families migrated to British Malaya in search of a livelihood. After a few years, Chattu Nair married Ammalu in an arranged marriage. Vasudevan was born on 15 June 1944 as their eighth and youngest child.  Even though he was a Malayali, as was the case with the majority of contemporary South Indian migrants to Malaya then, his surroundings in Malaysia was dominated by the Tamil language and culture. As such, Tamil became his language of choice, at school and at home.

Chattu Nair was musically inclined and all his children grew up with a natural ability to sing and appreciate music. Malaysia Vasudevan had once said that all his family members, except his mother Ammalu, were singers. Chattu Nair used to entertain the estate labourers by singing. He first started learning music from his father and later on, his brother taught him. Vasudevan started singing on stage when he was eight. Vasudevan was also interested in acting.

When Vasudevan grew up, he attached himself to Tamil drama troupes in Malaysia as an actor and singer. The producers of one of his plays Ratha Paei, wanted to make it into a film. Vasudevan came with the group to Chennai and acted in the film Raththa Paei. He even sang a song for the film under the baton of G. K. Venkatesh, for whom Ilaiyaraaja was working as the assistant.

Professional career

Playback singer
Malaysia Vasudevan's first major song was in the film Delhi to Madras, that starred Jaishankar and Srividya. It was a comedy song "Paalu Vikkira Padma Un Paalu Romba Suthhama?", for the music director V. Kumar. This chance was made possible by his friendship with the film's producer Pollachi Rathnam. After that, he joined the Pavalar Brothers troupe which was run by Ilaiyaraaja and his brothers.
 
During a stage performance, music director M. S. Viswanathan heard Vasudevan and gave him a small piece of a song in Bharatha Vilas (he sang for the Punjabi in "Indhiya Naadu En Veedu") and then a song in Thalai Prasavam. His first big break came when Kunnakudi Vaidyanathan made him sing "Kaalam Seyyum Vilaiyattu" in Kumasthavin Magal. Vasudevan was rechristened Malaysia Vasudevan by A. P. Nagarajan in this film.
 
Later, when his good friend Ilaiyaraaja debuted in the Tamil film industry with Annakili, he was asked to sing in the film, and after "Aattukutti Muttai Ittu" from 16 Vayathinile happened, Malaysia Vasudevan never looked back. Ilaiyaraaja backed him until he became a star singer.
 
Malaysia Vasudevan has sung close to 8,000 songs in his career spanning three decades, most for Ilaiyaraaja. Illayaraja made Malaysia Vasudevan sing songs of all types and genres. Malaysia Vasudevan performed each song with utmost sincerity and surprised everyone with the range he had.
 
Soft romantic songs like "Indha Minminikku" (Sigappu Rojakkal), "Vaan Megangalay" (Pudhiya Varpugal), "Malargale Nadha Swarangal" (Kizhake Pogum Rayil), "Malargalilay Aaraadhanai" (Karumbu Vil), "Kodai Kaala Kaatray" (Panneer Pushpangal), "Poove Ilaya Poove" (Kozhi Koovuthu), "Thangachangili Minnum Painkili" (Thooral Ninnu Pochchu), etc. must be some of the timeless favourites of Tamil film music lovers.
 
Even under the baton of M. S. Viswanathan, Malaysia Vasudevan sang many illustrious songs. "Ezhudhugiral Oru Pudhukkavithai" (Saranaalayam), "Enniyirundhadhu Eadera" (Andha 7 Naatkal) and the super-hits from Billa are just a few examples. 
 
Sensuous songs like "Kanna Thorakkanum Saami", or "Nila Kaayudhu" and emotional songs like "Oru Thanga Rathathhil" (Dharma Yuddham), "Allithhandha Bhoomi Annai Allava" (Nandu), "Adi Aadu Poongodiye" (Kali), "Vaa Vaa Vasanthamey" (Puthu Kavithai), "Pattuvanna Rosavam" (Kannipparuvathile) and "Ponmaana Thedi Naanum Poovodu" (Enga Oor Rasathi) all came easily to Vasudevan and succeeded in showing some other brilliant facets of the wonderful singer. His largely folksy tunes sung for Shankar–Ganesh are also of inimitable class. In the nineties, he got to sing a few, but most of them sensuous hits, for A. R. Rahman, including "Then Kizhakku" (Kizhakku Cheemayile) and "Monalisa Monalisa" (Mr. Romeo). The famous song "Poo Pookum Osai" (Minsara Kanavu) featured Vasudevan's voice in the chorus part.
 
He was the king of singing folk songs and songs with a village background, he was the voice behind several of Rajni Kanth's hit songs and he, Malayasia Vasudevan, sang a good number of hit duets with S Janaki. Ilaiyaraaja chose this singing pair whenever he had a folk song or a song which needed some special singing and they successfully made all his works big hits.

Some of the best songs of Malaysia Vasudevan happened at the time when he was considered the voices of Sivaji Ganesan and Rajinikanth; songs like "Mudhal Mariyathai", "Pothuvaga En Manasu Thangam" (Murattukalai) and "Aasai Nooru Vagai" (Adutha Varisu) to name a few.
 
Malaysia Vasudevan was like T. M. Soundararajan, who was content with the popularity achieved only in Tamil. He was of the notion that if he sang in other languages, he should have known well the nuances of other languages. 
 
Vasudevan worked with many music directors such as M. S. Viswanathan, Ilaiyaraaja, Shankar–Ganesh, Deva, A. R. Rahman and Vidyasagar. After T. M. Soundararajan, he was called as the ghost voice for Sivaji Ganesan. His first song was for the film Delhi to Madras. He has sung over 8,000 songs in Tamil and over 4,000 songs in various other South Indian languages. He has also sung a few songs in Hindi.

Malaysia Vasudevan has sung many songs for Rajinikanth. Some of his notable songs for Rajinikanth were "Singamondru Purapattadhe" (Arunachalam), "Yejaman Kaladi Manneduthu" (Yejaman), "Agaya Gangai", "Oru Thanga Rathathil" (Dharma Yuddham) "Solli adippaenadi" (Padikkathavan), all songs in Adhisayap piravi and many others.

He has also lent his voice for a few albums, the most notable among them is Disco Disco (1987), a collaboration with composer Dilip (A. R. Rahman) and playback singer K. S. Chithra. The album is noted for being the first album production of A. R. Rahman. Though it didn't become much popular, Disco Disco Vol 2 was also released later.

Music Direction
Malaysia Vasudevan composed music for a few movies like "Uravugal" "Itho Varugiren" "Samanthi Poo" (1980), "Pakku Vethilai" (1981) "Ayiram Kaigal" "Aaraavathu  Kurukku Theru" (1984), "Kolusu (1985), "Rajaavin Paarvai"(1988), etc.

Direction
He has directed a film called Nee Sirithal Deepavali (1991).

Acting career
Malaysia Vasudevan has also acted in nearly 85 films. Veteran Tamil director A. P. Nagarajan christened him "Malaysia Vasudevan". Some of his notable films include Oorkavalan (with Rajinikanth), Mudhal Vasantham (with Sathyaraj), Oomai Vizhigal (with Vijayakanth), Kathanayagan (with Pandiyarajan), Oru Kaidhiyin Diary (with Kamal Haasan), Jallikattu, Thiruda Thiruda, Amaidhi Padai, Poove Unakkaga, Badri,Punnagai Desam and Kokki. Besides acting in films, he has acted in a good number of tele-serials.

Writer
Malaysia Vasudevan wrote a book of poems called "Ennam Thondriyathu Ezhutha Thoondiyathu" in the year 2010.

Last projects
Vasudevan's last song was "Happy" from the film Bale Pandiya (2010), in the music of Devan Ekambaram. His last film as an actor Ithanai Naalaai Engiruthaai is yet to be released. The last song he wrote was "Devathaiye" for the film Balam (2009), in the music of his son Yugendran Vasudevan Nair.

Personal life
Malaysia Vasudevan married Annaporani, also known as Usha Vasudevan on 26 January 1976. Malaysia Vasudevan has three children Yugendran, Prashanthini and Pavithra. His son Yugendran has acted and sang in some films in Tamil and other languages. Malaysia Vasudevan's daughter Prashanthini too is a playback singer. She has sung songs like "Mundhinam" in the movie Vaaranam Aayiram and many more. Another Pavithra is married and resides in Malaysia. Malaysia Vasudevan has five grandchildren. Visashan Naarayan, Kishan Naarayan and Darshan Naarayan born to Yugendran, Saii Naarayan born to Pavithra and Rithvik son of Prashanthini.

Awards
He has been awarded Kalaimamani by the Tamil Nadu Government. He is also a 2-time winner of the Tamil Nadu State Film Award for Best Male Playback.

Death
A chronic diabetic and hypertension patient, Malaysia Vasudevan had a stroke in 2003, which slowed his mobility. On 10 February 2011, he was admitted for high fever. He developed gangrene in his big toe. He died from the gangrene on 20 February 2011 in Chennai, Tamil Nadu.

Some of the notable songs
"Alli Thandha Bhoomi"  (Nandu)
"Aagayam Bhoomi Rendum" (Saamandhippoo)
"Shankara Shiva" (Rajarishi)
"Pothuvaga En Manasu" (Murattukkalai)
"Kodai Kaala Kaatre" (Panneer Pushpangal)
"Attukkutti muttayittu" (16 Vayathinile)
"Sevvnthi poomudicha" (16 Vayathinile)
"Monalisa Monalisa" (Mr. Romeo)
"Aasai Nooruvagai" (Adutha Varisu)
"Oru Kootukiliyaga" (Padikkadavan (1985 film))
"Unna Partha Neram", "Singari Pyari","Annakiliye","Thaa Nanthana Gummi kotti", "Paatukku Paattu Edukkava"(Athisaya Piravi)
"Kovil mani oosai thannai" (Kizakke Pogum Rail)
"Ponmaana Thedi Naanum Poovodu" (Enga Oor Raachathi)
"Suham Suhame Eyei Thoda Thoda Thane" (Naan Potta Savaal)
"Aaagaya gangai, Oru thanga radathil" (Dharma Yuddam)
"Then Kizhakku" (Kizhakku Cheemayile)
"Kaadu potta Kaadu" (Karuththamma)
"Poo Pookkum Oosai" (Minsara Kanavu)
"Vetthalaiya Pottendi" (Billa (1980 film))
"Thangangale Thambigale" (Thillu Mullu)
"Devathai Pol oru Pen Ingu Vandathu" along with Mano (singer) (Gopura Vasalile)
"Aathu mettula oru paattu kekkuthu" (Giramaththu athiyayam)
"Aazhakkadali thediya muthu" (Sattam En Kaiyil)
"Aanatha then katru thalttuthe" (Manippoor Mamiyar)
"Kaathal vaibohame kaanum nannalile" (Suvar illatha sithirangal)
"Koodalooru gundumalli, kootathula kuninji" (Kumbakkarai Thangaiya)
"Poove ilaya poove varamtharum" (Kozhi Koovuthu)
"Vetti veru vaasham" (Mudhal Mariyathai)
"Mapillaikku Maaman Manasu" (Netrikkann)
"Kaadhal Vandhuduchu aasaiyil odi vandaen" (Kalyanaraman)
"Katti vechuko intha anbu manasa" (En Jeevan Paaduthu)
"Vaa vaa vasanthame sugam tharum" (Pudhu Kavidhai)
"Alli thatha boomi annai allava" (Nandu)
"Ananda then sinthum pooncholayil" (Mann Vasanai)
"Aasai Nooru Vagai, Vazhvil Nooru Suvai" (Adutha Vaarisu)
"Eh Rasathi" (En Uyir Thozhan)
"Malaiyoram Mayile" (Oruvar Vaazhum Aalayam)
"Enna Sugaama" "Oru ooril oru Maharani" (Garjanai)
"Pulli Vacha Oru Ponnatha", "Poove Poove Ponnama", "Patukku Jodiya","Yaar Paadum Paadal" (Paattukku Naan Adimai)
"Ponmaana Thedi" (Enga Ooru Rasathi)
"Kathal vaibhogame" (Suvarilla Chithiram)
"Naan Appodhu" (Pagal Nilavu)
"Thanga Changili" (Thooral Ninnu Pochchu)
"Thaalaatta Naan" (Thooral Ninnu pochu)
"Mamavukku Kuduma Kuduma" (Punnagai Mannan)
"Per vechaalum" (Micheal Madhana Kamarajan)
"Singam Ondru Purappathade" (Arunachalam)
"Yen Thaayin Meedhu Aanai" (Mr. Bharath)
"Enna Ma kannu" along with S.P.Balasubramaniam (Mr. Bharath)
"Maman Ponukku" along with S.P.Balasubramaniam (Chinna Thambi Periya Thambi)
"Yejaman Kaaladi Maneduthu, Netthiyila Pottu Vechom" (Yejaman)
"Ooru Vittu Ooru Vandhu" along with Gangai Amaran (Karagattakaran)
"Mariamma Mariamma" (Karagattakaran)
"Paattu Inge " (Poovizhi Vasalile)

Filmography
Actor
This is a partial list of some of the films Malaysia Vasudevan has acted in. 

Director
Nee Sirithal Deepavali (1991)

TV Serials
 2000 Micro Thodargal- Thedathe Tholainthu povai 
 2006-2007 Lakshmi as Puniyakodi

Composer
Saamanthi poo
Sonnathu nee thaana (2006) (suresh)

References

External links

Rakkamma.com
Tfpage.com
Tamilasia.com

1944 births
2011 deaths
Tamil playback singers
Tamil singers
Malaysian Hindus
Malaysian people of Indian descent
Malaysian people of Malayali descent
Malaysian emigrants to India
Musicians from Palakkad
Tamil Nadu State Film Awards winners
20th-century Indian musicians
Tamil film score composers